The MDFA Super Division is a men's semi-professional football league in Mumbai, a city in the Indian state of Maharashtra. The league serves as the second-tier of the Mumbai Football League and is organized by the Mumbai District Football Association. It is contested by 29 clubs. The two teams standing 1st and 2nd in their respective groups after completion of the Group Stage, advance to the knockout round of the MDFA Super Division. The team standing last after completion of the Group Stage in the each group will be demoted to the First Division of the 2018-19 season. The matches will be played at Mumbai Football Arena and St Xaviers Ground.

Teams Qualified For play-off

Group A
FSI - Seaview
Bombay Gymkhana

Group B
Dena Bank
FC India

Group C
Central Railway
Bank of India

Group D
Air India U-19
HDFC Bank

Play-off

Group A

Group B

Semi finals

Final

References

Football in Mumbai
2017–18 in Indian football leagues